Peter de Kock is a Dutch cameraman, film producer and director. He studied at the Film academy in Amsterdam and worked as a director of photography on many films and documentaries. De Kock made his directorial debut with the film The Hands of Che Guevara, a documentary about the severed hands of the Latin American guerrilla fighter Ernesto Che Guevara that were put in a jar of formaldehyde and disappeared from public view. The film was a success at many international film festivals.

Filmography

Cinematographer
Loenatik (1997)
Stephan Lorant, A man in pictures (1997)
Kinky Friedman, Proud to be an asshole from el Paso (2001)
Planet Kamagurka (2004)
John Callahan, Touch me someplace I can feel (1990)

Director
The Hands of Che Guevara (2006)

External links

Official website
The Hands of Che Guevara film website

1967 births
Living people
Dutch cinematographers
Dutch film directors
Dutch film producers
People from Maastricht